Varel Joviale Rozan (born 9 September 1992) is a Congolese professional footballer who plays as a right-back for AS Vita Club and the Congo national team.

Club career
Rozan began his senior career with the local Congolese club Étoile du Congo in 2011. He moved to Morocco with KAC Kénitra in the Botola in 2012, where he stayed until 2017. He returned to the Republic of the Congo, with successive stints at AC Léopards, Diables Noirs, Étoile du Congo, and AS Otohô. On 7 August 2021, he transferred to the DR Congolese club AS Vita Club.

International career
Rozan made his senior debut with the Congo national team in a 0–0 2018 African Nations Championship qualification tie with the DR Congo on 11 August 2017. He was part of the Congo team that played at the 2018 and 2020 African Nations Championships.

References

External links
 
 

1992 births
Living people
People from Pointe-Noire
Republic of the Congo footballers
Republic of the Congo international footballers
Association football fullbacks
Botola players
Linafoot players
AC Léopards players
CSMD Diables Noirs players
AS Vita Club players
Republic of the Congo expatriate footballers
Republic of the Congo expatriate sportspeople in Morocco
Expatriate footballers in Morocco
Republic of the Congo expatriate sportspeople in the Democratic Republic of the Congo
Expatriate footballers in the Democratic Republic of the Congo
Republic of the Congo A' international footballers
2018 African Nations Championship players
2020 African Nations Championship players